Chaceon bicolor is a species of crab. Chaceon bicolor differs from all species of the genus in color pattern, with the anterior part of the body purplish rather than reddish. In addition to color pattern, C. bicolor also differs from C. granulatus in having compressed rather than depressed dactyli on the walking legs; also, the hepatic region of the carapace in C. granulatus is coarsely granular, whereas it is smooth in C. bicolor. Juvenile specimens differ from adults in many features: the teeth of the carapace are much larger and sharper, there is a sharp spine on the carpus of the cheliped and a distal spine on the merus of each walking leg, plus the legs are longer and slenderer. Adult females differ from males in having much sharper anterolateral teeth on the carapace, sharper suborbital spines, and much shorter legs, with less trace of a distal dorsal projection on the merus. The carapace of females is more strongly arched from front to back and the protogastric regions are noticeably more inflated. The species is named as such because of its colour patter, purple an tan.

Description

Its median pair of frontal teeth is narrower than the laterals, separated by a U-shaped emargination. The carapace has a distinct granulation medial to the fifth tooth and on protogastric, cardiac, and branchial regions; its hepatic region is smooth; protogastric region inflated in large specimens, especially in females.

Its cheliped is lightly tuberculate dorsally; upper margin of merus with a sharp subdistal spine; the carpus lacking an outer spine in adults; propodus unarmed distally. Meri of its posterior walking legs has a distinct distal dorsal angled projection, spined in juveniles. The dactyli of walking legs are laterally compressed.

The anterior part of the carapace is predominantly purple, its branchial regions tan and its legs yellowish.

Distribution

References

External links

ADW entry
WORMS entry

Portunoidea
Crustaceans described in 1989